Hapalorchis is a genus of flowering plants from the orchid family, Orchidaceae, native to Central America, South America, and the West Indies.

Hapalorchis cymbirostris Szlach. - Rio de Janeiro
Hapalorchis lindleyana Garay - Rio de Janeiro
Hapalorchis lineata (Lindl.) Schltr. - widespread from Guatemala east to Puerto Rico and south to Brazil
Hapalorchis longirostris Schltr. - Colombia
Hapalorchis neglecta Szlach. & Rutk. - Ecuador
Hapalorchis pandurata Szlach. - Rio de Janeiro
Hapalorchis piesikii Szlach. & Rutk. - Colombia
Hapalorchis pumila (C.Schweinf.) Garay - Costa Rica, Ecuador, Peru
Hapalorchis stellaris Szlach. - Rio Grande do Sul
Hapalorchis trilobata Schltr. - Colombia

See also 
 List of Orchidaceae genera

References 

 Pridgeon, A.M., Cribb, P.J., Chase, M.A. & Rasmussen, F. eds. (2003). Genera Orchidacearum 3. Oxford Univ. Press
 Berg Pana, H. 2005. Handbuch der Orchideen-Namen. Dictionary of Orchid Names. Dizionario dei nomi delle orchidee. Ulmer, Stuttgart

External links 
 
 

 
Cranichideae genera